Femvatna (The Five Lakes) is a group of five small lakes in Nordenskiöld Land at Spitsbergen, Svalbard. The lakes are located east of the headland of Kapp Bjørset, and northwest of the plain of Lågnesflya.

References

Lakes of Spitsbergen